Alguien te está mirando  (English language:Somebody is Watching You) is a 1988 Argentine horror film directed and written by Gustavo Cova and Horacio Maldonado. The film starred Horacio Erman. The horror film was released in English speaking countries as Somebody is Hanging Around.

Synopsis
A group of students are put under by North American scientists to experience the effects of a new drug that allow to share dreams. The consequences are disastrous.

Cast
Horacio Erman
Marisa Ferrari
Andrea Fusero
Lucy Green
Hugo Halbrich
Jorge Abel Martín
James Murray
Daniela Pal
Michel Peyronel
Ana María Pittaluga
Osvaldo Santoro

Overview

Release and acclaim
The film premiered on 3 November 1988.

External links
 

1988 horror films
1988 films
1980s Spanish-language films
Argentine horror films
1980s Argentine films